, alternately read Hōkoku Shrine (Hōkoku-jinja), refers to a number of Shinto shrines in Japan dedicated to kampaku and ruler of Japan Toyotomi Hideyoshi.  The two names are different readings of the same kanji and are used interchangeably for some shrines.

Toyokuni Shrine or Hōkoku Shrine may refer to:

Hōkoku Shrine (Osaka) in Osaka, Osaka Prefecture
Toyokuni Shrine (Kanazawa) in Kanazawa, Ishikawa Prefecture
Toyokuni Shrine (Nagoya) in Nagoya, Aichi Prefecture
Toyokuni Shrine (Kyoto) in Kyoto, Kyoto Prefecture
Toyokuni Shrine, located on the grounds of Itsukushima Shrine in Hatsukaichi, Hiroshima Prefecture

See also
 Toyokuni (disambiguation)